Aero Africa was a charter airline based in Swaziland. The airline was on the list of air carriers banned in the European Union.

Fleet
The Aero Africa fleet consisted of the following aircraft:

1 Boeing 727-100
1 Boeing 737-200 (which is operated for Toumaï Air Tchad)
2 McDonnell-Douglas DC-10
The average age of the Aero Africa fleet was 40.7 years.

External links

References

Defunct airlines of Eswatini
Airlines established in 2004
Airlines formerly banned in the European Union